The Soviet sale of Hermitage paintings in 1930 and 1931 resulted in the departure of some of the most valuable paintings from the collection of the State Hermitage Museum in Leningrad to Western museums. Several of the paintings had been in the Hermitage Collection since its creation by Empress Catherine the Great. About 250 paintings were sold, including masterpieces by Jan van Eyck, Titian, Rembrandt, Rubens, Raphael, and other important artists.  Andrew Mellon donated the twenty-one paintings he purchased from the Hermitage to the United States government in 1937, which became the nucleus of the National Gallery of Art in Washington, D.C.

History 

In the late 1920s, the Soviet government urgently needed foreign currency to finance the rapid industrialization of Russia ordered in the first Five Year Plan.  The government had already sold off collections of jewelry, furniture and icons seized from the Russian nobility, wealthy classes, and the church.

In February 1928, the State Hermitage Museum in Leningrad, along with the Russian Museum, was ordered to make a list of art works worth at least two million rubles, for export. A special agency called 'Antiquariat' was created under the Narkompros  (the People's Commisariat of Enlightenment) and opened an office in Leningrad to oversee the sale.  The Hermitage was instructed to sell 250 paintings for at least 5000 rubles each, plus engravings and a number of golden treasures from ancient Scythia.

The sale was secret, but word was quietly spread to selected western art dealers and collectors that the paintings were on the market.

The first foreign buyer to purchase Hermitage paintings was Calouste Gulbenkian, the founder of the Iraq Petroleum Company, who began buying paintings in early 1930, trading them for oil with the Russians. These works later formed part of the Calouste Gulbenkian Museum, in Lisbon. However, the organizers of the sale were dissatisfied with the amounts they received from Gulbenkian, so they looked for other buyers.

Andrew Mellon was an American banker, Secretary of the Treasury under Presidents Warren G. Harding, Calvin Coolidge, and Herbert Hoover, art collector, and, at the time, American Ambassador to Great Britain. He conceived the idea of founding an art museum for the United States modeled after the National Gallery (London). He heard about the secret Hermitage sale from Knoedler and Company of New York, dealers which he regularly used for his art purchases.

Franz Zatzenstein-Matthiesen, a young German art dealer, had been asked by the Soviet Government to compile a list of the hundred paintings in Russian collections, which should never be sold under any circumstances. He was surprised soon afterwards to find several of the paintings on his list were in Paris, purchased by Gulbenkian. Gulbenkian asked him to act as his agent on further purchases, but Matthiesen instead formed a consortium with Colnaghi's of London and with Mellon's firm, Knoedler. In 1930 and 1931 the consortium bought twenty-one paintings from the Soviet government, which they offered to Mellon, who had the right of first refusal. By the end of 1931, Mellon had acquired twenty-one paintings for a total price of $6,654,000. They included Van Eyck's Annunciation and Raphael's The Alba Madonna.  The latter painting was sold for $1,166,400, the largest sum ever paid for a single painting until that time.  The consortium sold several other paintings to other clients, including the Metropolitan Museum of Art in New York.

The sale remained secret until November 4, 1933, when it was reported in the New York Times that several Hermitage paintings, including the Crucifixion and Last Judgement diptych by van Eyck, had been purchased by the Metropolitan Museum.

The sales came to an end in 1934, possibly as a result of a letter to Stalin from the deputy director of the Hermitage, Joseph Orbeli, protesting the sale of Russia's treasures. The director of the Hermitage, Boris Legran, who had been brought to the museum to conduct the sale, was dismissed in 1934 and replaced by Orbeli.

In 1937, Andrew Mellon donated the twenty-one paintings, along with the money to build a National Gallery of Art to house them, to the United States Government. The paintings were, and remain, the heart of the National Gallery of Art collection.

Other sales were made in the same period, notably the Codex Siniaticus from the Russian National Library, sold in 1933 to the British Museum (after 1973 British Library) for £100,000 raised by public subscription (worth £ in ), and The Night Café by Vincent van Gogh.

In the 1990s, following the collapse of the Soviet Union, the Parliament of the Russian Federation passed a new law prohibiting the sale of Russian art treasures to foreign countries.

For many years the National Gallery of Art was reluctant to lend the paintings it had bought from the Hermitage back to that Museum, for fear that the Russian government would keep the paintings in Russia. That policy changed after 1990, when Mikhail Piotrovsky became director of the Hermitage. A number of the National Gallery paintings have been on loan to the Hermitage, including Venus with a Mirror by Titian, which was lent to the Hermitage at the time of the first visit of the President George W. Bush to St Petersburg in 2002.

Timeline 

February 1928

Hermitage ordered to prepare list of paintings for sale.

April 1929

 Circle of Dierick Bouts, Annunciation, (sold to Calouste Gulbenkian, now Museu Calouste Gulbenkian, Lisboa, Portugal)
 Hubert Robert, Le Tapis Vert, (sold to Calouste Gulbenkian, now Museu Calouste Gulbenkian, Lisboa, Portugal)
 Hubert Robert, Le Bosquet des Bains d’Apollon, (sold to Calouste Gulbenkian, now Museu Calouste Gulbenkian, Lisboa, Portugal)

January 1930

 Antoine Watteau, The Lute Player (sold to Calouste Gulbenkian.)
 Rembrandt van Rijn, Portrait of Titus,  (sold to Calouste Gulbenkian)
 Anthony van Dyck, Susanna Fourment and her daughter (sold to Mellon syndicate)
 Anthony van Dyck,  Portrait of Philip, Lord Wharton (sold to Mellon syndicate)

March 1930

 Peter Paul Rubens, Portrait of Helena Fourment, (sold to Calouste Gulbenkian, now Museu Calouste Gulbenkian, Lisboa, Portugal)

May 1930

 Nicolas Lancret, The Beautiful Bathers, (sold to Calouste Gulbenkian, then resold to George Wildenstein. Now in a private collection.)

June 1930

 Jan van Eyck, The Annunciation, (sold to Mellon syndicate for $502,899.)
 Rembrandt van Rijn, Pallas Athenas, (sold to Calouste Gulbenkian, now Museu Calouste Gulbenkian, Lisboa, Portugal)

July 1930

 Anthony van Dyck, Portrait of Isabella Brandt (sold to Mellon syndicate for $223,000.)

October 1930

 Rembrandt van Rijn, Portrait of an Old Man, (sold to Gulbenkian for 30,000 pounds sterling Museu Calouste Gulbenkian, Lisboa, Portugal)

November 1930

 Adriaen Hanneman, Portrait of Henry, Duke of Gloucester (sold to Mellon syndicate)
 Veronese, The Finding of Moses (sold to Mellon syndicate)

January, 1931

 Rembrandt van Rijn, Joseph Accused by the Wife of Potiphar (sold to Mellon syndicate)

February 1931

 Frans Hals, Portrait of a Young Man (Mellon syndicate).
 Rembrandt van Rijn, Woman with a Pink  (Mellon syndicate).
 Rembrandt van Rijn, Portrait of a Polish Nobleman, (Mellon syndicate).
 Raphael, Saint George and the Dragon. (Mellon Syndicate)
 Velázquez. Portrait of Pope Innocent X  (Mellon Syndicate; the New York version)
 Sandro Botticelli, The Adoration of the Magi, (Mellon Syndicate.)
 Frans Hals, Portrait of an Officer. (Mellon Syndicate.)
 Rembrandt van Rijn, Women with a Rose, (Mellon Syndicate)
 Jean-Baptiste-Siméon Chardin, House of Cards,  (Mellon Syndicate.)

April 1931

 Rembrandt van Rijn, A Turk.  (Mellon Syndicate.)
 Anthony van Dyck, Portrait of a Flemish lady.  (Mellon Syndicate.)
 Pietro Perugino, The Crucifixion with the Virgin Mary, Saint John, St. Jerome and St. Mary Magdalene. (Mellon Syndicate).
 Raphael, The Alba Madonna.  (sold to Mellon Syndicate for $1,166,400)
 Titian, Venus with a Mirror. (Mellon Syndicate.)

February 1932

 Giovanni Tiepolo, The Banquet of Cleopatra, (sold to Knoedler and Colnaghi Galleries, now in National Gallery of Victoria in Melbourne, Australia)

Others
Crucifixion and Last Judgement diptych by van Eyck, bought by the Metropolitan Museum of Art in November 1933

References

Bibliography 
 Selling Russia's Treasures by Nicholas Iljine, Natalia Semenova and Amir G. Kabiri (project directors). MTA Publishing (The M.T. Abraham Foundation), Paris-Moscow, 2013.
 Prodannye Sokrovishcha Rossii (lit. The Sold Treasures of Russia) by Nicholas Iljine and Natalia Semenova (project directors). Russkiy Avantgard publishers, Moscow, 2000.
 Kopper, Philip. America's National Gallery of Art : A Gift to the Nation. Harry Abrams, New York, 1991.
 Serapina, N. Ermitazh kotory my poteryali (lit. The Hermitage which we lost.) Neva, Number 3, 1999.
 Walker, John, The National Gallery, Washington. Thames & Hudson, London, 1964.

Foreign trade of the Soviet Union
National Gallery of Art
History of museums
Hermitage Museum
Soviet sale
Foreign relations of the Soviet Union
1930 in the Soviet Union
1931 in the Soviet Union
1930 in art
1931 in art
Government finances in the Soviet Union